The 2008 Tennessee Democratic presidential primary took place on February 5, 2008, also known as Super Tuesday.

Polls

Results

See also 
Democratic Party (United States) presidential primaries, 2008
Tennessee Republican primary, 2008

References 

Tennessee
2008 Tennessee elections
2008
2008 Super Tuesday